CYLC may stand for:

 Congressional Youth Leadership Council, a United States-based youth organization 
 Kimmirut Airport Canada (ICAO airport code)
 Communist Youth League of China